The 2012 Rolex Sports Car Series season was the thirteenth running of the Grand American Road Racing Association's premier series. It began with the 24 Hours of Daytona on January 28–29.

Schedule
The schedule was announced on November 9, 2011. It consists of thirteen rounds. Twelve were announced that day. The final round at Lime Rock was announced November 14.

Teams and drivers

Team changes

On August 31, 2011, it was announced that Jeff Segal was testing a Ferrari F458 at the infield road course of Homestead-Miami Speedway in preparation for the 2012 season. Segal's Grand Am career dates back to 2003, with Ferrari as his primary choice of manufacturer.
On September 1, 2011, it was announced that Riley Technologies will be debuting a new Daytona Prototype at the 2012 24 Hours of Daytona.
On September 7, 2011, it was announced that Audi was developing a version of their R8 for the Rolex Sports Car Series GT class.
On October 20, 2011, it was announced that Eric Curran and Boris Said would return to Marsh Racing, driving Chevrolet Corvettes.
On October 26, 2011, it was announced that AIM Autosport would be fielding a new Ferrari 458 Italia in the 2012 season.
On November 22, 2011, it was announced that three-time series champion Andy Lally would return to Grand-Am competition full-time, joining John Potter in the Magnus Racing Porsche 911 GT3 Cup for the full 2012 GT schedule.
On December 3, 2011, it was announced that Racers Edge Motorsports will be switching from the Mazda RX8 to the Dodge Viper.
On December 3, 2011, it was announced that AF Corse, Michael Waltrip and Rob Kauffman will make a partnership for the Rolex 24 at Daytona. The team will field a Ferrari F458.
On December 3, 2011, it was announced that two teams will field a Ford Mustang in the Rolex 24 at Daytona. The former Mustang team TPN Racing/BlackForest will return with the car alongside the Rick Ware Racing, which switched from a Porsche GT3 last year.

Daytona Prototype changes

On May 13, 2011, Grand Am announced that various changes would be made to the Daytona Prototypes for the 2012 season:

The greenhouse (cockpit) area will be nearly identical for all newly constructed cars. The roll cage will be narrower on each side of the car, although the driver's position will not change. There will be a one-inch zone throughout the greenhouse surface to allow for individual styling cues, including windshield implementation and window outlines.
New minimum body cross-section provisions will give the new DPs a more upright front fascia and nose, rather than the more sloped layout of today's cars. This will allow manufacturers to add more design character to their cars, making them closer to their production cars while still offering the dramatic message embodied by a prototype.
Flexibility has also been introduced into the rules for side bodywork, including production-derived sidepods and open vents behind the front wheels that will enable styling elements from street cars to be functional on the race cars.

Additional changes
On May 27, 2011, it was announced that BMW was developing a new 4.5 liter V8 which debuted at the 2012 Daytona 24. The engine is primarily derived from that of the E92 generation BMW M3.
On November 15, 2011, Chevrolet unveiled its new Corvette-inspired DP. It made its debut at the Daytona 24.

Results

Championship standings
Source:

Daytona Prototypes

Drivers

Notes
 Drivers denoted by † did not complete sufficient laps in order to score points.

Chassis

Engine

Grand Touring

Drivers (Top 30)

Notes
 Drivers denoted by † did not complete sufficient laps in order to score points.

Engine

North American Endurance Championship

The 2012 season marks the start of a three-race "endurance championship" featuring the 24 Hours of Daytona, the Six Hours of Watkins Glen, and the new race at Indianapolis. In Daytona, there are points in 6, 12, 18 and 24 hours. In Watkins Glen 3 and 6 with double points, and quadruple points in Indianapolis at the end of the race.

References

Rolex Sports Car Series
Rolex Sports Car Series